The Hunter of Fall is a 1936 German drama film directed by Hans Deppe and starring Paul Richter, Franz Loskarn and Rolf Pinegger. It is based on the 1883 novel The Hunter of Fall by Ludwig Ganghofer.

The film's sets were designed by the art director Hans Kuhnert.

Cast
 Paul Richter as Friedl, Jagdgehilfe
  Marie Sera as Friedls Mutter
  Franz Loskarn as Hias, Jagdgehilfe
  Georgia Holl as Burgl, Sennerin
  Rolf Pinegger as Lenz, Senner
  Hans Adalbert Schlettow as Huisen Blasi
  Willy Rösner as Birkhofbauer
  Betty Sedlmayr as Loni
  Thea Aichbichler as Buchnerin
  Hans Hanauer as Förster Donhart
  Hélène Robert  as Therese, Frau des Försters
  Gustl Gstettenbaur as Toni Donhart
  Philipp Veit as Dr. Rauch
  Josef Eichheim as Brandtner Michl
  Hans Henninger as Leichtl Sepp

References

Bibliography

External links

1936 films
Films of Nazi Germany
1936 drama films
1930s German-language films
Films directed by Hans Deppe
Remakes of German films
Sound film remakes of silent films
Films based on The Hunter of Fall
UFA GmbH films
German black-and-white films
1930s German films